Surrender in Paradise is a 1976 Australian film directed by Peter Cox and starring Ross Gilbert and Errol O'Neill. It has been referred to as "Queensland's first alternative film".

Plot
Around 1900, bushranger Rusty Swan receives a message that his mother is dying. He sets off with his partner Cecil and girlfriend Valda to see her, chased by a posse led by Sergeant Rutter. They travel through time and wind up in modern-day Surfers Paradise.

Cast
Ross Gilbert as Rusty Swan
Errol O'Neill as Sergeant Rutter
Carolyn Howard as Valda
Rod Wissler as Cecil

Production
Two thirds of the film's cost was provided by the Film, Radio and Television Board of the Australia council. Shooting took place in November and December 1975 near Brisbane and on the Queensland Gold Coast.

It was the first and only feature film from Queensland director Peter Cox.

References

External links
Surrender in Paradise at IMDb
Surrender in Paradise at Oz Movies
Complete copy of film at Peter Cox's YouTube Channel

Australian thriller drama films
1970s English-language films
1976 films
1970s thriller drama films
Australian science fiction thriller films
1970s Australian films